Richard Arthur  is a professor of biochemistry and genetics at the University of Wisconsin-Madison.  He got his bachelor's degree in biology at Pennsylvania State University.  He went on to receive his PhD in biochemistry at Indiana University in 1982 and did post doctoral research at the University of Washington.  Amasino's research focuses on plants and how plants know when to flower. In 2006 he was elected to the National Academy of Sciences.

Amasino’sresearch has focused on how plants know when to flower after exposure to winter, a process called vernalization. Amasino discovered that annual and biennial Brassicaceae—and in particular  Arabidopsis thaliana—will only flower after prolonged cold treatment by shutting off a gene called Flowering Locus C (FLC). Recently, his work has centered on vernalization responses in temperate grasses using Brachypodium distachyon.

Honors and awards
2018 Carlos O. Miller Professor of Biochemistry
2013 Hilldale Professorship
2011 American Association for the Advancement of Science Fellow
2009 Elected Fellow of the American Society of Plant Biologists
2008 Hildale Professorship
2006 Elected to the U.S. National Academy of Sciences
2006 Howard Hughes Medical Institute Teaching Professor
2003 Wisconsin Distinguished Professor Biochemistry, UW-Madison
1989-1994 Presidential Young Investigator Award, National Science Foundation
1986 McKnight Foundation Individual Research Award in Plant Biology

References

External links
Hhmi.org
Biochem.wisc.edu

American biochemists
American geneticists
Living people
Members of the United States National Academy of Sciences
University of Wisconsin–Madison faculty
1956 births